This is a list of African-American newspapers that have been published in the state of Maryland.  It includes both current and historical newspapers.  

Maryland's first known African-American newspaper was The Lyceum Observer, launched by members of the Galbreath Lyceum in 1863. It was followed in 1865 by The True Communicator, which is also sometimes named as the state's first African-American newspaper.  

As in many other states, the late 19th century saw a dramatic growth in Maryland's African-American press, with 31 newspapers launched in Baltimore before 1900.  Most were short-lived.  A notable exception was The Afro-American, which launched in Baltimore in 1892 and continues today.

In addition to The Afro-American, other notable newspapers published in Maryland today include the Baltimore Times and The Prince George’s Post.

Newspapers

See also 

List of African-American newspapers and media outlets
List of African-American newspapers in Delaware
List of African-American newspapers in Pennsylvania
List of African-American newspapers in Virginia
List of African-American newspapers in Washington, D.C.
List of newspapers in Maryland

Works cited

References 

Newspapers
Maryland
African-American
African-American newspapers